The 1941 Texas Longhorns football team was an American football team that represented the University of Texas as a member of the Southwest Conference during the 1941 college football season. In their fifth year under head coach Dana X. Bible, the Longhorns compiled an 8–1–1 record (4–1–1 against conference opponents), won the Southwest Conference championship, were ranked No. 4 in the final AP Poll, and outscored its opponents by a total of 338 to 55.

Four Longhorns were selected as first-team players on the 1941 All-Southwest Conference football team: fullback Pete Layden, halfback Jack Crain, end Malcolm Kutner, and guard Chal Daniel. Kutner was also selected by the Associated Press, International News Service and Collier's as a first-team All-American and was later inducted into the College Football Hall of Fame.

On November 3, 1941, the Longhorns became the first Texas Longhorns football team to reach No. 1 in the AP Poll. They were recognized as national champions by Berryman QPRS, James Howell, and the Williamson System.

Schedule

References

Texas
Texas Longhorns football seasons
Texas Longhorns football